Sir John Akomfrah  (born 4 May 1957) is a British artist, writer, film director, screenwriter, theorist and curator of Ghanaian descent, whose "commitment to a radicalism both of politics and of cinematic form finds expression in all his films".

A founder of the Black Audio Film Collective in 1982, he made his début as a director with Handsworth Songs (1986), which examined the fallout from the 1985 Handsworth riots. Handsworth Songs went on to win the Grierson Award for Best Documentary in 1987.

In the words of The Guardian, he "has secured a reputation as one of the UK’s most pioneering film-makers [whose] poetic works have grappled with race, identity and post-colonial attitudes for over three decades."

Early life and education
John Akomfrah was born in Accra, Ghana, to parents who were involved with anti-colonial activism. In an interview with Sukhdev Sandhu, Akomfrah said: "My dad was a member of the cabinet of Kwame Nkrumah's party.... We left Ghana because my mum's life was in danger after the coup of 1966, and my father died in part because of the struggle that led up to the coup." Living in Britain since the age of four, Akomfrah was educated at schools in West London and at Portsmouth Polytechnic, where he graduated in Sociology in 1982.

Career
In 1982, he was one of the founders of the Black Audio Film Collective, which was active until 1998, dedicated towards examining issues of Black British identity through film and media. Handsworth Songs, the first documentary produced by the collective, with Akomfrah as director, focused on racial tensions in Britain in the 1980s. Incorporating archive material and newsreel, and making experimental use of sound, Handsworth Songs won seven international awards, among them the BFI John Grierson Award for Best Documentary.

In 1998, together with Lina Gopaul and David Lawson, his long-term producing partners, Akomfrah co-founded Smoking Dogs Films.

From 2001 to 2007 he served as a Governor of the British Film Institute. From 2004 to 2013 he served as a governor of the film organisation Film London.

Akomfrah has taught multiple courses at an academic institutions like Massachusetts Institute of Technology, Brown University, New York University, Westminster University, Princeton University. A tri-campus three-day event entitled "Cinematic Translations: The Work of John Akomfrah" was held in November 2013 at the University of Toronto, where he was artist-in-residence. A Harvard Film Archive critique of his work states: "Akomfrah has become a cinematic counterpart to such commentators of and contributors to the culture of the Black diaspora as Stuart Hall, Paul Gilroy, Greg Tate and Henry Louis Gates. In doing so, he has continued to mine the audiovisual archive of the 20th century, recontextualizing these images not only by selecting and juxtaposing them but also through the addition of eloquent and allusive text."

On 24 January 2023, it was announced that Akomfrah will represent the UK at the 60th Venice Biennale in 2024.

Solo presentations
Akomfrah has had solo presentations at Bildmuseet in Umeå, Sweden (2015), Broad Art Museum, East Lansing (2014), Tate Britain, London (2013), Institute of Contemporary Arts, London (2012), the Museum of Modern Art, New York (2011) and the British Film Institute, in the BFI Gallery (2010).

In 2013 his major work The Unfinished Conversation, a multi-layered installation, was shown in Tate Britain for six months in 2013, and was acquired for the National Collection. Marking its 10th anniversary, The Unfinished Conversation was remounted at the Midlands Arts Centre as part of the Birmingham 2022 festival.

His 2015 work, Vertigo Sea, is a three-screen film installation that was shown at the 56th Venice Biennale in May 2015. Vertigo Sea premiered in the UK at the Arnolfini in Bristol (16 January–10 April 2016) coinciding with an exhibition of new and recent work by Akomfrah being shown at the Lisson Gallery. In October 2016 his 40-minute two-screen video installation Auto Da Fé, filmed in Barbados and inspired by the theme of 400 years of migration and religious persecution, went on show. Vertigo Sea premiered in the UK at the Arnolfini in Bristol (16 January–10 April 2016) coinciding with an exhibition of new and recent work by Akomfrah being sin Cardiff.

Purple (2017), a 62-minute, six-screen video installation commissioned for the prominent Curve Gallery space at the Barbican, London, Akomfrah describes as "a response to [the] Anthropocene". A tie-in series of film screenings comprising selections made by Akomfrah was held from October 2017 at the Barbican Cinema. The installation travelled to the Museo Nacional Thyssen-Bornemisza, Madrid; Bildmuseet Umeå, Sweden; the Boston Institute of Contemporary Art; and Museu Coleção Berardo, Lisbon.

Awards and honours
Akomfrah was appointed Officer of the Order of the British Empire (OBE) in the 2008 New Year Honours for services to the film industry. In March 2012, he was awarded the European Cultural Foundation's Princess Margaret Award. In 2013 he was awarded honorary doctorates from University of the Arts London and from Goldsmiths, University of London. In 2014 he was awarded an honorary doctorate from Portsmouth University, the reformed polytechnic from which he had graduated in 1982.

In 2017, Akomfrah won the biennial Artes Mundi prize, the UK's biggest award for international art, having been chosen for the award for his "substantial body of outstanding work dealing with issues of migration, racism and religious persecution", including his work Auto Da Fé. Akomfrah said of his winning two-screen video installation, which explores the theme of mass migration over a 400-year period: "I wanted to focus on the fact that many people have to leave because something terrible is happening, it’s not just about leaving for a better life, many people feel they have to leave to have a life at all."

Akomfrah was appointed Commander of the Order of the British Empire (CBE) in the 2017 Birthday Honours for services to art and film making. He was named Artist of the Year in the 2018 Apollo Magazine Awards. He was elected a Royal Academician in 2019.

He was knighted in the 2023 New Year Honours for services to the arts.

Filmography

 Handsworth Songs (1986); winner of Grierson Award for Best Documentary, 1987
 Testament (1988)
 Who Needs a Heart (1991)
 Seven Songs for Malcolm X (1993)
 The Last Angel of History (1996)
 Memory Room 451 (1996)
 Call of Mist (1998)
 Speak Like a Child (1998)
 Riot (1999)
 The Nine Muses (2010)
 Hauntologies (Carroll/Fletcher gallery, 2012)
 The Stuart Hall Project (2013), relating to the cultural theorist Stuart Hall
 The Unfinished Conversation (2013)
 The March (2013)
 Vertigo Sea (2015)
 Auto Da Fé (2016)
 Untitled (2016)
 Purple (2017)
 Precarity (2018)

References

External links
 

 "John Akomfrah" at Lisson Gallery.
 "John Akomfrah" in conversation with Elisabetta Fabrizi at Tyneside Cinema.

1957 births
Living people
20th-century British male writers
20th-century British writers
20th-century English screenwriters
21st-century British male writers
21st-century British screenwriters
Alumni of the University of Portsmouth
Black British artists
Black British cinema
Black British filmmakers
British male writers
Knights Bachelor
Commanders of the Order of the British Empire
English male screenwriters
Film directors from London
Ghanaian emigrants to England
Ghanaian film directors
Ghanaian screenwriters
Naturalised citizens of the United Kingdom
People from Accra
Royal Academicians
Writers from London